Lavendon Castle stood to the north of the village of Lavendon, Buckinghamshire, England.

A motte or ringwork and bailey were mentioned in a pipe roll of 1192–3. It was probably built by a member of the Bidun family, and later belonged to the Pevers. The motte was destroyed in 1944 when much 12th-century pottery was found. A farmhouse and garden terracing built in the 17th century have effectively destroyed the former mound and today only earthworks remain.

References

Photograph of earthworks

Castles in Buckinghamshire